The First Rains of Spring is a 2011 drama film. It is a Kazakhstani-Japanese co-production and is directed by Erlan Nurmuhambetov and Shinju Sano. The film won the Grand Prix at the Eurasia Film Festival.

References

External links
 

2011 films
2011 drama films
2010s Russian-language films
Kazakhstani drama films
Japanese drama films
2010s Japanese films